Gheorghe Ciobotaru (born 14 December 1953) is a Romanian wrestler. He competed in the men's Greco-Roman 74 kg at the 1976 Summer Olympics.

References

1953 births
Living people
Romanian male sport wrestlers
Olympic wrestlers of Romania
Wrestlers at the 1976 Summer Olympics
Sportspeople from Galați
Universiade silver medalists for Romania
Universiade medalists in wrestling
Medalists at the 1977 Summer Universiade
World Wrestling Championships medalists